The Nikkan Sports Drama Grand Prix is an award given by the Nikkan Sports newspaper to Japanese television dramas.

The 14th Nikkan Sports Drama Grand Prix was canceled due to the 2011 Tōhoku earthquake and tsunami.

Categories
Best Drama
Best Actor
Best Actress
Best Supporting Actor
Best Supporting Actress
Best Newcomer

Winners

See also

 List of Asian television awards

References

External links
List of Nikkan Sports Drama Grand Prix 

Awards established in 1997
Japanese television awards
1997 establishments in Japan